Psammotis pulveralis is a moth of the family Crambidae described by Jacob Hübner in 1796. It is found in Iran and the southern part of Europe, although it dwells further north on occasion, and at times even establishes a short-lived population, as happened in 1869 near Folkestone and the Isle of Wight.<ref>{{cite web |title=TAXONOMY BROWSER: Psammotis pulveralis |url=http://www.boldsystems.org/index.php/TaxBrowser_TaxonPage?taxid=224879 |website=Boldsystems |access-date=26 July 2021}}</ref>

The wingspan is 23–25 mm. The moth flies from June to September depending on the location.

The larvae feed on water mint (Mentha aquatica) and gypsywort (Lycopus europaeus'').

References

External links
 UKMoths
 Lepidoptera of Sweden
 

Pyraustinae
Moths described in 1796
Moths of Asia
Moths of Europe
Taxa named by Jacob Hübner